Réunion is located east of Madagascar and is a province (département) of France. Réunion is home to maloya and sega music.

Genres

Sega                                   

Séga is a popular style that mixes African and European music.

Maloya

Maloya has a strong African element reflected in the use of slave chants and work songs.

Non-traditional music
In Réunion there is a very strong jazz community and rock culture is also becoming strong on the island.

Rap, Reggae, Zouk, Ragga and Dancehall are also popular. One popular ragga song recently is Ragga Chikungunya about the 2005 mosquito disease outbreak.

Popular musicians
The most popular sega musicians include Baster, Ousanousava, and Ziskakan. The most popular maloya musicians are Danyel Waro. Meddy Gerville and Firmin Viry. Other popular singers include Maxime Laope, Léon Céleste, Henri Madoré and Mapou, named after a kind of perfumed sugarcane candy. Musicians from nearby Mauritius are also popular.

Popular songs

Ti Fleur Fanée
The unofficial national anthem of Réunion is a song originally sung by Georges Fourcade called Ti Fleur Fanée

Madina
The song "Madina" was chosen as the theme song by the Office de Radiodiffusion Télévision Française in the 1950s and 1960s. The song was written by Maxime Laope, one of the island's most popular singers, and performed by another renowned singer, Henri Madoré.

Festivals
One of the biggest music festivals in Réunion is the Sakifo music festival.

See also
Run Vibes
Ralé-poussé

References

External links
Sakifo Music Festival website

 
Réunionnais culture